Tovarishch, tovarisch or tovarish is a Russian word meaning comrade, friend, colleague, or ally, and may refer to:

Arts and entertainment
 Tovaritch (1933 play), a 1933 play in French by Jacques Deval
 Tovaritch (film), a 1935 French film based on the 1933 play
 Tovarich (1935 play), a 1935 play in English by Robert E. Sherwood based on Deval's 1933 play
 Tovarich (film), a 1937 American film based on the Sherwood play
 Tovarich (musical), a 1963 musical based on the 1935 play
 Tovarich, a comic strip by Antonio Prohías

Other uses
 Gorch Fock (1933), a German three-mast barque used by the USSR under the name Tovarishch
 Tovarishch (newspaper) (1906–1908), a daily paper published in St. Petersburg, Russia

See also
 Towarzysz, cavalry soldiers in the Polish army since the 16th century